Ron "Suki" King (born 1956) is an English checkers player from Saint George, Barbados. He has won twelve world championship titles at the game and is considered one of the strongest players of the game. King has been honored by his homeland being named Barbados's Sportsman of the Year in both 1991 and 1992. He has been called the Muhammad Ali of the checkers world for his trash-talking. 

In 1998 he made it into Guinness World Records for playing against 385 players simultaneously and beating them all.
His 2008 match against South African grandmaster Lubabalo Kondlo is the central subject in the documentary King Me. In 2014 he lost his world title in the GAYP ("go as you please") version to Sergio Scarpetta, as King failed to appear for the final four games.

World Championship titles
3-time world champion (3-move version): 1994, 1996, 1997
9-time world champion (GAYP version): 1991, 1992, 1996, 1998, 2000, 2003, 2006, 2006, 2008

References

External links
Checkers Champion Ronald "Suki" King

1956 births
Living people
Barbadian checkers players
Players of English draughts
People from Saint George, Barbados
Date of birth missing (living people)
Place of birth missing (living people)